Heapstown Cairn is a cairn and National Monument located in County Sligo, Ireland.

Location

History

Heapstown Cairn is thought to have been constructed c. 3000 BC and may enclose a passage grave like those at the Carrowkeel Megalithic Cemetery, located  SSE of Heapstown. In folk tradition it was the burial site of Ailill mac Echach Mugmedóin, brother of Niall of the Nine Hostages.

One account of the cairn's construction is given in the Second Battle of Moytura. Dian Cecht, healer to the Tuatha Dé Danann, puts healing herbs into the Well of Sláine, and the Tuatha Dé Danann drink from it. The Fomorians, on a suggestion from the warrior Ochtriallach, fill it with stones to keep their enemies from using it. Thus it is known as Carn Ochtriallach "Ochtriallach's cairn."

In 1837, when it was illustrated by George Petrie, it stood to its full height and had a standing stone on the summit. However, much of the stone has been removed since then for road-building by the time it was illustrated by William Wakeman in 1878.

Description

There is a kerb of huge limestone blocks around the edge of the cairn. The monument has been extensively quarried on all sides except the southeast, which probably contains an undiscovered passage grave beneath the cairn. Passage grave style megalithic art was discovered on a south-facing kerbstone in 1998.

References

National Monuments in County Sligo
Archaeological sites in County Sligo